Libya Telecom & Technology (LTT) was originally established in 1997 as a private company by Ahmed A. Al-Mosbahi. LTT remains a state owned monopoly which continues to dominate the Libyan ISP sector. LTT is Libya's most-used service provider, and much of the country's 5.6% (380,000 users 2016-17 rating ), Internet penetration is attributable to its DSL and WiMAX services. Ahmed A. Al-Mosbahi was the Chairman of LTT and all telecom companies in Libya. LTT announced their new LTT4G network on 6 March 2018, and since then it's available to the public.

After the Libyan Civil War and the subsequent collapse of the Gaddafi regime, LTT is trying to revamp its network and services. However, due to internal conflict and rising strain on services, many popular provisions have been plagued by network congestion and poor reception.

In March 2012, Saad Ksheer was appointed CEO of the company, following his previous posts with Microsoft and NCR in the US and UAE. Later Saad was sacked and replaced.

If a consumer poll were to be released on how well LTT supplies its networking service, it would ( speculatively ) receive one of the world's lowest internet providers ranking with much needed room for improvement.
LTT has informed its consumers that the slow speeds are due to poor reception, however this does not appear to be the case, as it seems that speeds are either capped or the network is simply not working 
to its full potential as advertised and sold.
 
Libya is in dire need of up to standard 'Internationally accepted' Internet networking service speeds ( 2015 ), all of which are yet to be supplied by companies interested in investing in the young and extremely potential market with little competition in Libya.

Internet Censorship and Filtering 
As of September 2013, Libya Telecom and Technology had implemented a filter system designed to omit pornographic media from viewing to the public. 
The move to omit pornographic material was reportedly started by the Local Islamic Judicial Court of Tripoli archived under article 421 of criminal Penalties. 
This move comes with the 2013 implementation of Islamic sharia law post 17 February revolution. While it is true that pornographic material is being omitted by LTT's local filtering system, 
it has been found that non pornographic media has also been affected raising controversy on the move due to Libya's politically unstable environment.

LTT has recently 'seemingly' implemented forced restriction on YouTube videos, blocking viewers from seeing videos flagged by the community as inappropriate. LTT is also blocking users from accessing any major proxy sites.
While under the guise to protect users from 'inappropriate' content, it appears political websites and anything deemed unfavorable to whoever's agenda is at LTT are also being blocked. These blocks are more questionable and controversial than they are useful and protective.

LTT's censorship filter affects any aspect regarding the reproductive system in humans, and or any words deemed "immoral",
the recognition software does not discriminate between educative websites and adult websites, barring users from accessing information regarding reproduction, pregnancy, and medical - educative websites. Any input into a search engine with inappropriate words are instantly flagged by the system and access is denied.

Services 

Note: As of 2015 - 2016, LTT, still holding a monopoly on internet service provision in Libya, has achieved world status rating of 'Slowest internet in the world'.
According to a new report from Akamai, the average internet connection speed in Libya is the slowest in the world at 0.5 Mbit/s. 
This puts Libya behind Bangladesh, which has an average connection speed of 1.0 Mbit/s, and Bolivia, Cameroon, Botswana, and Yemen with speeds of 0.9 Mbit/s.

ADSL Services are deemed slower than the new LibyaMax services due to disorganized cable infrastructure requiring adequate maintenance and repair 
providing consumers slower than expected internet speeds. Cable infrastructure especially in the Tripoli Residential capital area ( Omar Al-Mukhtar ) can be observed as being disorganized and damaged, with old copper wiring still serving the typical household and not providing the intended-advertised services. LTT Headquarters is near the capital - 'Al-Shat Road / Coastal Road' where Residential areas are most dense, hence cable infrastructure is inevitably disorganized and poorly maintained, bringing about poor service delivery to typical households in and out of the capital area.

WiMax service delivery is also ineffective due to large numbers of users connecting to major wireless hotspot antennas simultaneously. Although efforts were made by LTT 
to counter large numbers of connections in densely populated areas, service delivery still remains ineffective and slow (2017).

Services 2017 
Notable speed differences: 
During Ramadan Iftar time, 8:00, for about one hour time, speed rates return to normal speeds, confirming that the infrastructure is overloaded with users using the same channels for WiMax services. 
It also appears, that Libya Telecom technology has been using Bandwidth throttling to change internet speeds in different areas of Tripoli to minimize bandwidth congestion. 
Around 6:00 a.m, internet speeds reach full speeds at around 250 kbit/s as stated in the contract between users and LTT, however, bandwidth speeds fall as low as 10 kbit/s after 9:00 am on daily basis for many 
around the capital area, Tripoli.

Internet Access Solutions 
Dial-up Internet Access
LTT4G (4G+)
LibyaADSL (ADSL2+)
LibyaMAX (WiMAX)
LibyaPhone (MVNO Mobile)
Libya FTTH (Fiber to the home)
Satellite (DVB-RCS) Access

Data Network Connection Solutions 
Data Network via Wireless
Data Network via VSAT

Communication Solutions 
VSAT
Microwave
GSM
3G
HSPA+
4G

Value-Added Services 
Webhosting and E-mail Services
Network Security Services

Consultation Services 
Technology and Communications

External links
 

Internet service providers of Libya
Companies established in 1997
Libyan brands
Economy of Tripoli, Libya